Sanyo Shokai New York, Inc. (Japanese: 三陽商会) is a  men's outerwear company founded in New York City in 1981 by Nobuyuki Yoshihara. Its parent company, Sanyo Shokai Ltd., dates back to 1943.

Its trademark rainwear is mostly sold in  department stores stores such as Nordstrom, Barneys, Saks Fifth Avenue, Macy's, Bloomingdale's, Hudson's Bay and  men's specialty retail stores. The company operates primarily in the United States and in Canada.

History
Sanyo Shokai New York, Inc. was founded in 1978 by Sanyo Shokai, Ltd. Sanyo Shokai, Ltd. is a Tokyo based company that was founded in 1943 by Nobuyuki Yoshihara, who is also the founder of Sanyo Shokai New York, Inc.

In 1986, Sanyo starting building its own state-of-the-art production facility in Oneonta, NY and opened that following year. Other locations had been considered, such as Connecticut and Georgia. However, with the closing of a textile factory in Oneonta, Sanyo chose the upstate New York location to hire experienced local textile workers.

In 1988, Sanyo Fashion House Co. Ltd. Italy opened in Milano.

In 1990, Sanyo Fashion House works with costume designer Carol Cohen to transform the classic trench coat into a fashion raincoat.

In 1999, Sanyo Sewing America closed.

In 2001, Sanyo held a promotional agreement with Palm to redesign Sanyo coats for the business traveler, featuring antimagnetic shields to prevent shock from static electricity and protection from radio waves.

In 2007, Sanyo Shokai New York, Inc. went online for the first time at with the launch of the Fall 2007 collection.

In the subsequent years, Sanyo designed RainWool—a series of wool overcoats that have the same impermeability to rain that their micro polyester raincoats offer.

In 2005 Sanyo Shokai stopped carrying its line of women's outerwear and has since specialized solely in men's outerwear.

References

External links 
 Sanyo Shokai New York, Inc. 
  Sanyo Shokai, Ltd.

Japanese brands
Clothing companies of the United States
Clothing companies established in 1981
Outdoor clothing brands

ja:三陽商会